The ruble (alternatively rouble) was the currency of the Soviet Union, introduced in 1922, replacing the Imperial Russian ruble. One ruble was divided into 100 kopecks ( – kopeyka, kopeyki). Soviet banknotes and coins were produced by the Federal State Unitary Enterprise (or Goznak) in Moscow and Leningrad.

In addition to regular cash rubles, other types of rubles were also issued, such as several forms of convertible ruble, transferable ruble, clearing ruble, Vneshtorgbank cheque, etc.; also, several forms of virtual rubles (called "cashless ruble") were used for inter-enterprise accounting and international settlement in the Comecon zone.

In 1991, after the dissolution of the Soviet Union, the Soviet ruble continued to be used in the post-Soviet states, forming a "ruble zone", until it was replaced with the Russian ruble in September 1993.

Etymology

The word ruble is derived from the Slavic verb , rubit', i.e., 'to chop'. Historically, a "ruble" was a piece of a certain weight chopped off a silver ingot (grivna), hence the name.

The word kopeck or copeck  (in Russian:  kopeyka) is a diminutive form of the Russian kop'yo—a spear. The reason for this is that a horseman armed with a spear was stamped on one of the faces of the coin. The first kopeck coins, minted at Novgorod and Pskov from about 1534 onwards, show a horseman with a spear. From the 1540s onwards the horseman bears a crown, and doubtless the intention was to represent Ivan the Terrible, who was Grand Prince of all Russia until 1547, and Tsar thereafter. Subsequent mintings of the coin, starting in the 18th century, bear instead Saint George striking down a serpent.

Ruble in the Soviet Union

The Soviet currency had its own name in all the languages of the Soviet Union, often different from its Russian designation. All banknotes had the currency name and their nominal printed in the languages of every Soviet Republic. The current names of several currencies of Central Asia are simply the local names of the ruble. Finnish last appeared on 1947 banknotes since the Karelo-Finnish SSR was dissolved in 1956.

The name of the currency in the languages of the fifteen republics, in the order they appeared in the banknotes:

Note that the scripts for Uzbek, Azerbaijani,  Turkmen and gradually Kazakh have switched from Cyrillic to Latin since the breakup of the Soviet Union. Moldovan has switched to Latin and is once again referred to as Romanian.

These fifteen names derive from four roots:
Turkic root , "pure"
Latin , "coin"
Old Ruthenian , "carve", "emboss", "mint"

Historical Soviet rubles

First Soviet ruble (paper), 1917–1922 
The first ruble issued for the Soviet government was a preliminary issue still based on the previous issue of the ruble prior to the Russian Revolution of 1917. They are all in banknote form and started their issue in 1919. At this time other issues were made by the white Russian government and other governing bodies. During that time, the Russian economy suffered from hyperinflation.

Denominations were as follows: 1-, 2-, 3-, 5-, 10-, 15-, 25-, 50-, 60-, 100-, 250-, 500-, 1,000-, 5,000-, 10,000-, 25,000-, 50,000-, and 100,000 rubles. Short-term treasury certificates were also issued to supplement banknote issue in 1,000,000-, 5,000,000-, and 10,000,000 rubles. These issue was printed in various fashions, as inflation crept up the security features were few and some were printed on one side, as was the case for the German inflationary notes.

Banknotes: In 1918, state credit notes were introduced by the RSFSR for 1-, 3-, 5-, 10-, 25-, 50-, 100-, 250 Rbls, 500 Rbls, 1,000 Rbls, 5,000 Rbls, and 10,000 rubles. These were followed in 1919 by currency notes for 1-, 2-, 3-, 15-, 20-, 60-, 100-, 250-, 500-, 1,000-, 5,000-, and 10,000 rubles. In 1921, currency note denominations of 5-, 50-, 25,000-, 50,000-, 100,000-, 1,000,000-, 5,000,000-, and 10,000,000 rubles were added.

Gold ruble (chervonets), 1921–1924 

The gold ruble existed in parallel with the paper ruble of 1917–1922, which continued to depreciate versus the former, climbing to 50 billion paper rubles per gold ruble in March 1924.

Coins: The first coinage after the Russian civil war was minted in 1921–1923 according to pre-war Czarist standards, with silver coins of 10 kop, 15 kop, 20 kop minted in 50% silver, 50 kop ("poltinnik" or Rbl ) and Rbl 1 in 90% silver, and Rbls 10 (chervonets) in 90% gold. These coins bore the emblem and legends of the RSFSR (Russian Soviet Federative Socialist Republic) and depicted the famous slogan, "Workers of the world, Unite!". These coins would continue to circulate after the RSFSR was consolidated into the USSR with other Soviet Republics until the discontinuation of silver coinage in 1931.

Third Soviet ruble, 1 January 1923 – 6 March 1924
The third Soviet ruble was issued equal to 1,000,000 paper rubles of 1917–1922, simply to handle the unwieldiness over the number of digits in the first currency. Again it continued to depreciate versus the gold ruble until the latter climbed to Rbls 50,000 in 1924. Only paper money was issued, in the form of state currency notes in denominations of 50 kopecks and 1, 5, 10, 25, 50, 100, 250, 500, 1,000, 5,000, and 10,000 rubles.

In early 1924, just before the next redenomination, the first paper money was issued in the name of the USSR, featuring the state emblem with six bands around the wheat, representing the languages of the then four constituent republics of the Union: Russian SFSR, Transcaucasian SFSR (Azerbaijani, Armenian, and Georgian), Ukrainian SSR and Byelorussian SSR. They were dated 1923 and were in denominations of Rbls 10,000, Rbls 15,000, and Rbls 25,000.

Fourth Soviet ruble, 7 March 1924 – 1947
After Joseph Stalin's consolidation of power following the death of Lenin, a final redenomination occurred which replaced all previously issued currencies. The fourth Soviet ruble was equal to 50,000 rubles of the third issue, or 50 billion paper rubles of the first issue, and began at par with the gold ruble ( chervonets). It built on the stability in the exchange value of the third ruble which happened towards the end of 1923.

Coins began to be issued again in 1924, while paper money was issued in rubles for values below 10 rubles and in chervonets for higher denominations. No chervonets were issued in gold, just decrees on the parity of circulating rubles with the gold ruble, which already failed to take hold as early as 1925.

Coins, 1924–1961

In 1924, copper and silver coins were again minted to pre-war Czarist standards, in denominations of  kop, 1 kop, 2 kop, 3 kop, and 5 kop (copper), 10 kop, 15 kop, and 20 kop (in 50% silver), and 50 kop, and Rbl 1 (in 90% silver). From this issue onward, the coins were minted in the name of the USSR (Union of the Soviet Socialist Republics). The "Workers of the World" slogan was carried forward. Coins issued 1921–1923 representing the gold ruble continued to circulate at par with this post-1924 ruble.

Copper coins were minted in two types; plain edge and reeded edge, with the plain-edged types being the fewest in number. The 1 Rbl coin was only issued in 1924, the poltinnik (or Rbl ) was issued 1924–27, and the denga (or  kopeck) was issued 1925–28. In 1926, smaller aluminium-bronze coins were minted to replace the large copper 1 kop, 2 kop, 3 kop, and 5 kop coins, but were not released until 1928. The larger coins were then melted down.

Stalin failed to maintain the ruble's value versus the gold ruble as early as 1925, and by 1930 its value even struggled to stay above the melt value of the silver 10-, 15-, and 20 kop coins. Soviet authorities scapegoated "hoarders" and "exchange speculators" as responsible for the shortages, and confiscatory measures were taken. In 1931, the remaining silver coins were replaced with redesigned cupro-nickel coins depicting a male worker holding up a shield which contained the denominations of each. All silver coins were to be returned and melted down.

In 1935, the reverse of the 10-, 15-, and 20 kopeck coins were redesigned again with a simpler Art Deco inspired design, with the obverse of all denominations also redesigned, having the "Workers of the world, unite!" slogan dropped. The change of the obverse designs did not affect all 1 kop, 2 kop, 3 kop, and 5 kop coins immediately, as some 1935 issues bore the "Workers of the World" design while some bore the new "CCCP" design. The state emblem also went through a series of changes between 1935 and 1957 as new soviet republics were added or created, this can be noted by the number of "ribbons" wrapped around the wheat sheaves. This coin series remained in circulation during and after the monetary reform of 1947 and was finally discontinued in 1961.

In August 1941, the wartime emergency prompted the minting facilities to be evacuated from the Neva district in Moscow and relocated to Permskaya Oblast as German forces continued to advance eastward. It only became possible to resume coin production in the autumn of 1942, for one year the country was using coins made before the war. Furthermore, the coins were made of what had suddenly become precious metals – copper and nickel, which were needed for the defense industry. This meant many coins were being produced in only limited quantities, with some denominations being skipped altogether until the crisis finally abated in late 1944. These disruptions led to severe coin shortages in many regions. Limits were put in place on how much change could be carried in coins with limits of 3 Rbls for individuals and 10 Rbls for vendors to prevent hoarding as coins became increasingly high in demand. Only high inflation and wartime rationing helped ease pressure significantly. In some instances, postage stamps and coupons were being used in place of small denomination coins. It was not until 1947 that there were finally enough coins in circulation to meet economic demand and restrictions could be eased.

Banknotes, 1924–1947
In 1924, state currency notes were introduced for 1-, 3-, and 5 gold rubles (рубль золотом). These circulated alongside the chervonets (чрв) notes introduced in 1922 by the State Bank in denominations of 1 чрв, 3 чрв, 5 чрв, 10 чрв, and 25 чрв. State Treasury notes replaced the state currency notes after 1928. In 1938, new notes were issued for Rbl 1, Rbls 3, and Rbls 5, dropping the word "gold".

Fifth Soviet ruble, 1947–1961
Following World War II, the Soviet government implemented a confiscatory redenomination of its currency (decreed on December 14, 1947) to reduce the amount of money in circulation. The main purpose of this change was to prevent peasants who had accumulated cash by selling food at wartime prices from using this to buy consumer goods as the postwar recovery took hold. Old rubles were revalued at one tenth of their face value.  This mainly affected paper money in the hands of private individuals.  Amounts of Rbls 3,000 or less in individual private bank accounts were not revalued, while salaries remained the same. This revaluation coincided with the end of wartime rationing and efforts to lower prices and curtail inflation, though the effects in some cases actually resulted in higher inflation. Unlike other reforms, this one did not affect coins.

Banknotes
In 1947, State Treasury notes were introduced in denominations of Rbls 1, Rbls 3, and Rbls 5, along with State Bank notes for denominations of Rbls 10, Rbls 25, Rbls 50, and Rbls 100. The State Bank notes depicted Lenin while the Treasury notes depicted floral artistic designs. All denominations were colored and patterned in a similar fashion to late Czarist notes.

In 1957, all these notes were reissued with the old date but modified design: because of the abolition of the Karelo-Finnish SSR, the number of ribbons on the state emblem was reduced from 16 to 15, and the nominal in Finnish was removed from the obverse.

Sixth Soviet ruble, 1961–1991, (Identified as ISO code SUR)

The 1961 redenomination introduced 1 new ruble equal to 10 old rubles and restated all wages, prices and financial records into new rubles. It differed from the confiscatory nature of the 1947 reform when banknotes were reduced to th of their value but wages and prices remained the same. Its parity to the US dollar underwent a devaluation, however, from US$1 = 4 old rubles (0.4 new ruble) to US$1 = 0.9 new ruble (or 90 kopecks). It implies a gold parity of Rbls 31.50 per troy ounce or Rbl 1 = 0.987412 gram of gold, but this exchange for gold was never available to the general public. Banknotes and coins of this series were designed by Ivan Dubasov.

Coins

The 1958 pattern series: by 1958, plans for a monetary reform were underway and a number of coin pattern designs were being experimented with before implementation. The most notable of these was the 1958 series, in denominations of 1 kop, 2 kop, 3 kop, and 5 kop in copper-zinc, and 10 kop, 15 kop, 20 kop, and 50 kop, and Rbl 1, Rbls 3, and Rbls 5 in copper nickel. These coins all had the same basic design and became the most likely for release. Indeed, they were mass-produced before the plan was scrapped and a majority of them were melted down. During this time, 1957 coins would continue to be restruck off old dies until the new coin series was officially released in 1961. This series is considered the most valuable of Soviet issues due to their scarcity.

On 1 January 1961, the currency was revalued again at a rate of 10:1, but this time a new coinage was introduced in denominations of 1 kop, 2 kop, 3 kop, and 5 kop in aluminium-bronze, and 10 kop, 15 kop, 20 kop, and 50 kop and 1 Rbl in cupro-nickel-zinc. Like previous issues, the front featured the state arms and title while the back depicted date and denomination. The 50 kop. and Rbl 1 coins dated 1961 had plain edges, but starting in 1964, the edges were lettered with the denomination and date. All 1926–1957 coins were then withdrawn from circulation and demonetized, with the majority melted down.

Commemorative coins of the Soviet Union: in 1965, the first circulation commemorative ruble coin was released celebrating the 20th anniversary of the Soviet Union's victory over Nazi Germany, during this year the first uncirculated mint-coin sets were also released and restrictions on coin collecting were eased. In 1967, a commemorative series of 10 kop, 15 kop, 20 kop, 50 kop, and Rbl 1 coins was released, celebrating the 50th anniversary of the Russian Revolution and depicted Lenin and various socialist achievements. The smaller bronze denominations for that year remained unchanged. Many different circulation commemorative 1 Rbl. coins were also released, as well as a handful of Rbls 3 and Rbls 5 over the years. Commemorative coins from this period were always slightly larger than general issues, 50 kop and Rbl 1 coins in particular were larger, while the 1967 series of the small denominations were the same circumference but thicker than general issues.

Initially, commemorative rubles were struck in the same alloy as other circulating coins until 1975, when its composition was changed to higher-quality copper-nickel with zinc excluded. Its specifications (31 mm diameter, 12.8 grams) were nearly identical to those of the 5-Swiss franc coin (31.45 mm, 13.2 g, cupronickel) worth approx. €4.39 or US$5.09 as of August 2018, resulting in the large scale use of (now worthless) Soviet commemorative coins to defraud automated vending machines in Switzerland years after they have been demonetized.

Starting in 1991 with the final year of the 1961 coin series, both kopeck and ruble coins began depicting the mint marks (М) for Moscow, and (Л) for Leningrad.

Banknotes
Banknotes were issued by the USSR State Treasury (Государственный казначейский билет, Gosudarstvenny kaznacheyskiy bilet) in denominations of Rbl 1, Rbls 3 and Rbls 5, and by the USSR State Bank (билет Государственного банка, Bilet gosudarstvennogo banka) in denominations of Rbls 10, Rbls 25, Rbls 50 and Rbls 100. Colors are similar to the previous series but notes were much smaller in size.

Seventh Soviet ruble, 1991–1993
The Monetary Reform of 1991 was carried out by Mikhail Gorbachev and was known also as the Pavlov Reform. It was the last of such in the Soviet Union and began on January 22, 1991. Its architect was Minister of Finance Valentin Pavlov, who also became the last prime minister of the Soviet Union. The details included a brief period to exchange old 1961-dated Rbls 50. and Rbls 100 notes for new 1991 notes — for three days from 23 to 25 January (Wednesday to Friday) and with a specific limit of no more than Rbls 1,000 per person—the ability to exchange other notes considered in the special commissions to the end of March 1991. See Monetary reform in the Soviet Union, 1991.

Coins
In late 1991, a new coinage was issued as direct obligations of the USSR State Bank in denominations of 10 kop and 50 kop, and Rbl 1, Rbls 5, and Rbls 10. The 10 kop coin was struck in brass-plated steel, the 50 kop coin, and Rbl 1 and Rbls 5 coins were in cupro-nickel. The Rbls 10 coin was bimetallic with an aluminium-bronze centre and a cupro-nickel-zinc ring. The series depicts an image of the Kremlin on the obverse rather than the Soviet state emblem. However, this coin series was extremely short-lived as the Soviet Union ceased to exist only months after its release. It did, however, continue to be used in several former Soviet republics including Russia and particularly Tajikistan for a short time after the union had ceased to exist out of necessity.

Banknotes
New 1991-dated banknotes were all issued as USSR State Bank notes (including the 1-, 3-, and 5-ruble denominations), with nearly identical colours and size for all denominations, but included more colour and heightened security features. The 25 Rbl note was omitted from this series, but still remained legal tender; all 1961 notes apart from the demonetized Rbls 50 and Rbls 100 denominations remained in circulation. An important modification of the design included the removal of the texts in languages of other Soviet republics (i.e. all texts were in Russian only) in the 1992 issues; all 1991 notes (in exception to the 2nd 1991 Rbls 100 banknote) contained all Soviet languages. In this series, Rbl 1. notes were issued on 27 June 1991, Rbls 3 notes on 3 November 1991, Rbls 5. notes on 5 July 1991, Rbls 10 notes on 10 July 1991, Rbls 50 and Rbls 100 notes on 23 January 1991, Rbls 200 notes on 29 October 1991, and Rbls 500 notes on 24 December 1991. Rbls 1,000 notes were issued in March 1992, after the Soviet collapse.
New 1992-dated notes, similar in appearance to the 1991 issues, were printed in denominations of Rbls 50–1,000. bearing the Soviet state emblem and name. A notable exception was that the more-colourful Rbls 100. note of this series was still dated 1991 unlike the others.

After the breakup of the Soviet Union, many newly independent republics chose to continue circulating Soviet rubles even after the introduction of the new Russian ruble in 1992.

Economic role
The Soviet Union ran a planned economy, where the government controlled prices and the exchange of currency. Thus the Soviet ruble did not function like a currency in a market economy, because mechanisms other than currency, such as centrally planned quotas, controlled the distribution of goods. Consequently, the ruble did not have the utility of a true currency; instead, it more resembled the scrip issued in a truck system. Soviet citizens could freely purchase a set of goods from state shops with rubles, but choice was limited and prices were always political decisions, having no direct connection to manufacturing cost. Bread and public transport were heavily subsidised, but wages were low and there were shortages of manufactured consumer goods, implementing hidden taxes. It was common to hold large savings in rubles in the state savings bank because credit was not available. Special rubles used in accounting were not exchangeable to cash, and were effectively different currency units pegged to the ruble. The currency was not freely exchangeable and its export was illegal. In bilateral trade, a separate, non-convertible "clearing ruble" credit was used. There were separate shops (Beriozka) for purchasing goods obtained with hard currencies. However, Soviet citizens could not legally own foreign currency. Thus, if they legally received payment in foreign currency, they were forced to convert it to Vneshposyltorg cheques at a rate set by the government. These cheques could be spent at a Beriozka. The sudden transformation from a Soviet "non-currency" into a market currency contributed to the economic hardship following the dissolution of the Soviet Union in December 1991.

Exchange rates

The Soviet Union officially valued the ruble in the planned economy at an average of US$1.35 (or Rbl 0.74 per US dollar; see below) from 1971 to 1988. However, as the ruble was not internationally exchangeable and as Soviet citizens could not legally own foreign currency, rubles changed hands in the black market at an average of Rbls 4.14 per dollar in the same period 1971–88. The opening up of the economy in the late 1980s under perestroika resulted in the recognition of more realistic exchange rates for the ruble, as follows:
 In November 1989 the ruble was devalued for foreign travel to a tourist rate of Rbls 6.26 per dollar (versus Rbl 0.6277 officially).
 In November 1990 a new commercial exchange rate of Rbls 1.80 per dollar was introduced. During this time, however, black market dollars changed hands at 20 Rbls.
 In April 1991, following the failed monetary reform of 1991, the tourist exchange rate was raised significantly to Rbls 27.60 per dollar, making the average monthly Soviet salary of Rbls 330 worth only $12 on the international market.
 Further pain would continue later that year with the dollar changing hands at Rbls 35-40 on the black market and Rbls 45-70 in government auctions as of October 1991.
 By early December 1991, just before the Soviet Union ceased to exist, the ruble was valued at nearly Rbls 100 to the dollar.

Official exchange rates Soviet ruble of the time per United States dollar:

Replacement currencies in the former Soviet republics

Shortly after the fall of the Soviet Union in 1991, local currencies were introduced in the newly independent states. Most of the new economies were weak and hence most of the currencies have undergone significant reforms since their introduction. In the very beginning of the post-Soviet economic transition, it was widely believed by ordinary people and monetary institutions (including the International Monetary Fund) that it was possible to maintain a common currency working for all or at least for some of the former Soviet Union's countries. The wish to preserve the strong trade relations between former Soviet republics was considered the most important goal.

During the first half of 1992, a monetary union with 15 independent states all using the ruble existed. Since it was clear that the situation would not last, each of them used their positions as "free-riders" to issue huge amounts of money in the form of credit (since Russia held the monopoly on printing banknotes and coins). As a result, some countries were issuing coupons in order to "protect" their markets from buyers from other states.  This also started to cause massive inflation in the formerly high-valued currency. The Russian central bank responded in July 1992 by setting up restrictions on the flow of credit between Russia and other states. The final collapse of the "ruble zone" began with the exchange of banknotes by the Central Bank of Russia on Russian territory at the end of July 1993. As a result, other countries still in the ruble zone (Kazakhstan, Uzbekistan, Turkmenistan, Moldova, Armenia and Georgia) were "pushed out". By November 1993 all newly independent states had introduced their own currencies, with the exception of war-torn Tajikistan (May 1995) and unrecognized Transnistria (1994). Due to ruinous inflation in the former Soviet Republics, most of the successor currencies had to be redenominated at least once, with the notable exceptions of the Armenian dram, Estonian kroon, Kazakh tenge, and Kyrgyz som.

Details on the introduction of new currencies in the newly independent states are discussed below.

See also
 Hyperinflation in early Soviet Russia
 List of commemorative coins of the Soviet Union

Footnotes

External links

 Leon Trotsky. The Revolution Betrayed. Chapter 4 - The Struggle for Productivity of Labor, associated with the issuence of the ruble, 1936
 A commercial site with some relevant historical information
 Catalog of USSR Banknotes from 1922
 Historical banknotes of the Soviet Union (incl. Banknotes of the successor States of the USSR) 

Economy of the Soviet Union
Currencies of Asia
Currencies of Europe
Currencies of Russia
Modern obsolete currencies
Post-Soviet states
1921 establishments in Russia
1991 disestablishments in the Soviet Union